Florilegus is a genus of long-horned bees in the family Apidae. There are about 14 described species in Florilegus.

Species
These 14 species belong to the genus Florilegus:

 Florilegus affinis Urban, 1970
 Florilegus barbiellinii
 Florilegus condignus (Cresson, 1878)
 Florilegus festivus (Smith, 1854)
 Florilegus flavohirtus Urban, 1970
 Florilegus fulvipes (Smith, 1854)
 Florilegus isthmicus
 Florilegus lanierii (Guérin-Méneville, 1845)
 Florilegus melectoides (Smith, 1879)
 Florilegus pavoninus Cockerell
 Florilegus purpurascens Cockerell, 1914
 Florilegus riparius Ogloblin, 1955
 Florilegus similis Urban, 1970
 Florilegus tucumanus (Brèthes, 1910)

References

Further reading

External links

 

Apinae
Articles created by Qbugbot